The Hopfner HS-10/32 was a utility aircraft built in Austria in the early 1930s. It was a conventional, high-wing, strut-braced cabin monoplane derived from Hopfner's series of parasol-wing light aircraft that began with the HS-5/28. Three examples (including the single prototype) flew in late 1932 under the designation HS-10/32, followed by a single example of the improved HS-10/33 the following year, a generally similar aircraft with revised ailerons. The HS-10/33 was eventually purchased by the Austrian Air Force to use as a liaison machine.

Specifications (HS-10/32)

References

External links
 Уголок неба

1930s Austrian civil utility aircraft
Hopfner aircraft
Aircraft first flown in 1932
High-wing aircraft
Single-engined tractor aircraft